Newell is a census-designated place in Modoc County, California in the United States. Its population is 301 as of the 2020 census, down from 449 from the 2010 census.

The ZIP Code is 96134: a code shared with several other local towns. The community is inside area code 530.

History
The town was named in honor of Frederick Haynes Newell, director of the United States Reclamation Service.

Geography

Demographics
The 2010 United States Census reported that Newell had a population of 449. The racial makeup of Newell was 199 (44.3%) White, 2 (0.4%) African American, 23 (5.1%) Native American, 1 (0.2%) Asian, 5 (1.1%) Pacific Islander, 193 (43.0%) from other races, and 26 (5.8%) from two or more races. Hispanic or Latino of any race were 271 persons (60.4%).

The Census reported that 449 people (100% of the population) lived in households, 0 (0%) lived in non-institutionalized group quarters, and 0 (0%) were institutionalized.

There were 136 households, out of which 69 (50.7%) had children under the age of 18 living in them, 74 (54.4%) were opposite-sex married couples living together, 24 (17.6%) had a female householder with no husband present, 8 (5.9%) had a male householder with no wife present.  There were 10 (7.4%) unmarried opposite-sex partnerships, and 0 (0%) same-sex married couples or partnerships. 23 households (16.9%) were made up of individuals, and 8 (5.9%) had someone living alone who was 65 years of age or older. The average household size was 3.30.  There were 106 families (77.9% of all households); the average family size was 3.68.

The population was spread out, with 167 people (37.2%) under the age of 18, 36 people (8.0%) aged 18 to 24, 116 people (25.8%) aged 25 to 44, 90 people (20.0%) aged 45 to 64, and 40 people (8.9%) who were 65 years of age or older.  The median age was 29.4 years. For every 100 females, there were 110.8 males.  For every 100 females age 18 and over, there were 108.9 males.

The homeowner vacancy rate was 1.2%; the rental vacancy rate was 8.6%.  259 people (57.7% of the population) lived in owner-occupied housing units and 190 people (42.3%) lived in rental housing units.

Politics

Landmarks

 There are many grain and horseradish storage facilities in or near Newell.
 Newell Elementary School, operated by Tulelake Basin Joint Unified School District, is a local landmark.
 Tulelake Municipal Airport (FAA identifier: 081 or zero-eight-one) features a  paved runway. The Common Traffic Advisory Frequency is 122.9 MHz.
 The site of the World War II U.S. Army facility named the Tule Lake War Relocation Center is near the north end of the community. The center was a prison camp for interned Japanese nationals, and U.S. citizens of Japanese ancestry, during a portion of the war.
 The Union Pacific Railroad Modoc Subdivision tracks run along the west side of town and parallel to SR139.
 Tulelake National Wildlife Refuge, a unit of Klamath National Wildlife Refuge, is northwest of the town. This is a U.S. Department of the Interior, U.S. Fish and Wildlife Service federal reservation.

See also
 Japanese American internment
 Lava Beds National Monument
 Tule Lake War Relocation Center
 Tionesta, California
 Tulelake, California

Sources
 Map: Lava Beds National Monument, California, 417-648/40240 (Washington, D.C.: Government Printing Office, 1997).
 U.S. Geological Survey, National Geographic Names Database.
 Map: U.S. Geological Survey, Newell, California, 7.5-minute Quadrangle, 1993.
 California Region Timetable: 14, (Modesto, California: Altamont Press, 2003).

References

Census-designated places in Modoc County, California
Census-designated places in California